Miss Grand United States 2016 was the first edition of the Miss Grand United States pageant, held on May 28, 2016, at Leonard Nimoy Thalia, Symphony Space, New York City. Thirteen national delegates competed for the title, of whom the representative of New York, Michelle Leon, was announced the winner. She then represented the country at the Miss Grand International 2016 pageant in Las Vegas, and was named the fourth runner-up.

Results

Contestants
Thirteen state titleholders competed for the national title.

References

External links

Official Website
 

Miss Grand United States
Grand United States 2016
2016 in the United States